Nananthea is a genus of flowering plants in the chamomile tribe within the daisy family.

Nananthea perpusilla is listed as "vulnerable" by IUCN.

Species
Nananthea perpusilla (Loisel.) DC. - native to Corsica and Sardinia, naturalized in parts of Germany
formerly included
Nananthea tassiliensis Batt. & Trab. - Daveaua anthemoides Mariz

References

Flora of Corsica
Flora of Sardinia
Monotypic Asteraceae genera
Anthemideae
Vulnerable plants